Heredia may refer to:

Places 

 Heredia, Costa Rica, a city
 Heredia (canton), Costa Rica
 Heredia Province, Costa Rica
 Heredia, Álava, Spain

Other uses 
 Heredia (etymology)
 Heredia (surname)
 Heredia (moth), a genus of moth
 Heredia Jaguares de Peten a football (soccer) team from San José, El Petén, Guatemala
 Heredia, a meteorite spotted in 1857, see meteorite falls

See also
 Hereditas, a scientific journal in genetics